Abrahamyan's government was the governing body of Armenia from April 2014 to September 2016. Hovik Abrahamyan was designated Prime Minister by President Serzh Sargsyan in April 2014.

It was a coalition government formed by Republican Party, Prosperous Armenia, Rule of Law party and ARF.

The cabinet consisted of eighteen ministries and eight adjunct bodies. Each ministry is responsible for elaborating and implementing governmental decisions in its respective sphere.

Structure

Ministries
The government of Armenia is led by Hovik Abrahamyan, who took the office in April 2014. The government of Armenia consists of eighteen ministries and has six adjunct bodies. Each ministry is responsible for elaborating and implementing the governmental decisions in its respective sphere.

'''
|-
|Prime Minister
|Hovik Abrahamyan
|Republican Party
|April 2014
|-
|Ministry of Defence
|Seyran Ohanyan
|Non-party
|14 April 2008
|-
|Ministry of International Economic Integration and Reforms
|Vache Gabrielyan
|Republican Party
|28 November 2014
|-
|Ministry of Agriculture
|Sergo Karapetyan
|Non-party
|31 December 2010
|-
|Ministry of Culture
|Hasmik Poghosyan
|Non-party
|1 June 2007
|-
|Ministry of Diaspora
|Hranush Hakobyan
|Republican Party
|1 October 2008
|-
|Ministry of Economy
|Artsvik Minasyan
|Armenian Revolutionary Federation
|24 February 2016
|-
|Ministry of Nature Protection
|Aramayis Grigoryan
|Non-party
|30 June 2014
|-
|Ministry of Education and Science
|Levon Mkrtchyan
|Armenian Revolutionary Federation
|24 February 2016
|-
|Ministry of Energy and Natural Resources
|Levon Yolyan
|Non-party
|29 February 2016
|-
|Ministry of Finance
|Gagik Khachatryan
|Non-party
|26 April 2014
|-
|Ministry of Foreign Affairs
|Eduard Nalbandyan
|Non-party
|15 April 2008
|-
|Ministry of Healthcare
|Armen Muradyan
|Non-party
|23 April 2014
|-
|Ministry of Justice
|Arpine Hovhannisyan
|Republican Party
|4 September 2015
|-
|Ministry of Labor and Social Affairs
|Artem Asatryan
|Republican Party
|16 June 2012
|-
|Ministry of Sport and Youth Affairs
|Gabriel Ghazaryan
|Non-party
|3 May 2014
|-
|Ministry of Territorial Administration and Development
|Davit Lokyan
|Armenian Revolutionary Federation
|24 February 2016
|-
|Ministry of Emergency Situations
|Armen Yeritsyan
|Non-partisan
|24 February 2016
|-
|Ministry of Transport and Communication
|Gagik Beglaryan
|Republican Party
|16 June 2012
|-
|Ministry of Urban Development
|Narek Sargsyan
|non-party
|23 April 2014
|}

Adjunct bodies

The role of adjunct bodies is to elaborate, implement and administer governmental decision in respective sphere. Similar to ministries, adjunct bodies are subordinate to Prime Minister. There are six adjunct bodies to Armenian government.

References 

Politics of Armenia
Political organizations based in Armenia
Government of Armenia
European governments